Ana-Maria Yanakieva (born 5 August 1998) is a Bulgarian singer from the music label Virginia Records, the official representative of Sony Music Entertainment for Bulgaria. She is also a scholar of Dimitar Berbatov Foundation. Ana-Maria is a finalist from Season 2 of X Factor Bulgaria, which took place in 2013.

Biography
Ana-Maria was born in Levski, a small town in central Northern Bulgaria. Her mother Ralitza and her father Alexander are economists. She grew up and finished her primary education in Varna, the largest city and seaside resort on the Bulgarian Black Sea Coast. In 2012, she and her family moved to the capital Sofia. 
Ana-Maria started singing at the age of 6. Since then, she has participated in numerous musical contests in Bulgaria and abroad, and has won many of them. Her vocal coach is Adelina Koleva, a well-recognized name among Bulgarian music professionals. Since 2008, Ana-Maria is a scholar of Dimitar Berbatov Foundation, a charitable organization established by one of the best Bulgarian football players, Dimitar Berbatov, to support talented children. 
Ana-Maria's first major TV appearance was at the age of 11 on bTV's Bulgaria's Got Talent in 2010, but unfortunately she didn't reach the final stage, despite of her amazing performance of the song "Fighter" by Christina Aguilera.

Her second and so far most successful appearance on TV was in Season 2 of X Factor Bulgaria, which took place in 2013. Although the rules of the show state that participants should be at least 16 years old, Ana-Maria was admitted by the executive producers to join the contest at the age of 15. After a series of astonishing live performances, she reached the final along with Zhana Bergendorff (winner) and Atanas Kolev (runner-up). She finished on 3rd place.

Discography

External links
 X Factor profile 
 Official Twitter page

References

1998 births
Living people
Musicians from Varna, Bulgaria
Bulgarian pop singers
Bulgarian rock singers
21st-century Bulgarian women singers
X Factor (Bulgarian TV series)